The Party of the Guatemalan Revolution (Partido de la Revolución Guatemalteca, PRG) was formed in June 1952 during the Guatemalan Revolution to unite the non-Communist parties which were supporting the administration of Jacobo Árbenz. These included the Popular Liberation Front, the National Renovation Party, the Revolutionary Action Party, and the Socialist Party. The Communist Guatemalan Party of Labour (PGT) was opposed to the formation of the PRG, fearing that it would undermine their influence in the government. The PAR and the PRN later withdrew. Although the PRG continued in existence until the overthrow of the President Árbenz, it had failed to achieve its original purpose of opposing Communist efforts to gain a predominant voice in the Árbenz government. It was disbanded after the coup d'état of 1954.

Bibliography
Communism in Guatemala, 1944-1954. by Ronald M. Schneider Published in 1979, Octagon Books (New York).
Political parties of the Americas : Canada, Latin America, and the West Indies / edited by Robert J. Alexander. Westport, Conn. : Greenwood Press, 1982.
Political and agrarian development in Guatemala by Susan A. Berger Published in 1992, Westview Press (Boulder).
A case history of communist penetration: Guatemala. by United States. Dept. of State. Office of Public Services. Published in 1957, (Washington).
Gleijeses, Piero, Shattered Hope: The Guatemalan Revolution and the United States, 1944-1954, Princeton, 1991.
Encyclopedia of Latin American History and Culture: 2nd ed. 2008.

Defunct political parties in Guatemala
Guatemalan Revolution
Socialist parties in Guatemala